General elections were held in British India in December 1945 to elect members of the Central Legislative Assembly and the Council of State. The Indian National Congress emerged as the largest party, winning 57 of the 102 elected seats. The Muslim League won all Muslim constituencies, but failed to win any other seats. Of the 13 remaining seats, 8 went to Europeans, 3 to independents, and 2 to Akali candidates in the Sikh constituencies of Punjab. This election coupled with the provincial one in 1946 proved to be a strategic victory for Jinnah and the partitionists. Even though Congress won, the League had united the Muslim vote and as such it gained the negotiating power to seek a separate Muslim homeland as it became clear that a united India would prove highly unstable.  The elected members later formed the Constituent Assembly of India.

These were the last general elections in British India; consequent elections were held in 1951 in India and 1970 in Pakistan.

Background
On 19 September 1945, the Viceroy Lord Wavell announced that elections to the central and provincial legislatures would be held in December 1945 to January 1946. It was also announced that an executive council would be formed and a constitution-making body would be convened after these elections.

Although the Government of India Act 1935 had proposed an all-India federation, it could not take place because the government held that the Princely states were unwilling to join it. Consequently, rather than choosing 375 members, only 102 elective seats were to be filled. Hence the elections to the central legislature were held under the terms of the Government of India Act 1919.

Results

Central Legislative Assembly

Membership by province

Elected members

See also
 Interim Government of India

References

1945 elections in India
1945 elections in Asia
1945
1945
1945
Central Legislative Assembly of India
December 1945 events in Asia
1945 elections in the British Empire